David Leonard Watts, Baron Watts (born 26 August 1951) is a British politician and life peer who served in the Blair and Brown governments as a Lord Commissioner of the Treasury from 2005 to 2010 and chaired the Parliamentary Labour Party as a backbencher from 2012 to 2015. A member of the Labour Party, he was Member of Parliament (MP) for St Helens North from 1997 to 2015.

Early life
Watts was educated at Malvern Primary School and Huyton Hey Secondary Modern School, Huyton. He was leader of St Helens Metropolitan Borough Council for four years. He was a union official at Huntley & Palmers' biscuit factory in Huyton.

Parliamentary career
Watts was a Government Whip and Lord Commissioner of HM Treasury from 2008 to 2010. On 15 March 2012, he was elected to succeed Tony Lloyd as the Chair of the Parliamentary Labour Party, a role he performed until he stood down to be replaced by John Cryer on 9 February 2015. He stood down at the 2015 General Election. Watts is associated with the Labour Friends of Israel.

Watts was nominated for a life peerage in the 2015 Dissolution Honours. On 23 October 2015, he was created Baron Watts, of Ravenhead in the County of Merseyside, for life. By virtue of that life peerage, he became a member of the House of Lords. He entered the House of Lords on 3 December 2015 continuing to sit under the Labour whip.

Personal life
Watts married Avril Davies in 1972, with whom he has two sons.

References

External links
 Guardian Unlimited Policies - Ask Aristotle: David Watts MP
 TheyWorkForYou.com - Dave Watts MP
 House of Lords
 Voting record

|-

|-

1951 births
Labour Party (UK) MPs for English constituencies
Labour Party (UK) officials
Labour Friends of Israel
Living people
UK MPs 1997–2001
UK MPs 2001–2005
UK MPs 2005–2010
UK MPs 2010–2015
Labour Party (UK) life peers
Life peers created by Elizabeth II